, better known by her ring name Lady C, is a Japanese professional wrestler currently working for the Japanese promotion World Wonder Ring Stardom.

Professional wrestling career

World Wonder Ring Stardom (2020–present) 
Nagatani made her professional wrestling debut in World Wonder Ring Stardom at Stardom Korakuen New Landscape on November 14, 2020, where she lost to Saya Iida. She took part of a Future of Stardom Championship tournament on May 15, 2021 Stardom Nagoya Two Days where she fell short to Unagi Sayaka in a first-round match.

She is known for competing in various of the promotion's signature events such as the Stardom All Star Dream Cinderella from March 3 where she competed in a 24-women Stardom All Star Rumble featuring superstars from the company's past such as Yuzuki Aikawa, Kyoko Inoue, Miho Wakizawa, Chigusa Nagayo, from the present Bea Priestley, Koguma and others. At Stardom Yokohama Dream Cinderella 2021 on April 4, she competed in a three-way match also involving Hina and AZM. Nagatani took part in all three of the Stardom Cinderella Tournament 2021 tournament's nights. In the first one from April 10 she fell short to Hina, on the second one from May 14 she competed in a four-way match won by Natsupoi and also involving Tam Nakano and Hanan and on the third one from June 12 unsuccessfully battled Rina and HIna in a three-way match. At Yokohama Dream Cinderella 2021 in Summer on July 4, she competed in a Gauntlet tag team match where she teamed up with Maika, falling short to Oedo Tai (Konami and Fukigen Death), Hanan and Hina and Oedo Tai (Saki Kashima and Rina). She pulled the first win of her career on the fifteenth night of the Stardom 5 Star Grand Prix 2021 from September 20 where she defeated Waka Tsukiyama in one of the latter's rookie series of matches. At Stardom 10th Anniversary Grand Final Osaka Dream Cinderella on October 9, 2021, Nagatani teamed up with Waka Tsukiyama in a losing effort against Oedo Tai's Saki Kashima and Rina. Nagatani participated in the 2021 edition of the Goddesses of Stardom Tag League where she fought in the Blue Goddess Block by teaming up with Waka Tsukiyama as "C Moon". They failed to score any points after going against the teams of MOMOAZ (AZM and Momo Watanabe), Blue MaRine (Mayu Iwatani and Rin Kadokura), Kurotora Kaidou (Starlight Kid and Ruaka), Ponytail and Samurai Road (Syuri and Maika) and Dream H (Tam Nakano and Mina Shirakawa). At Kawasaki Super Wars, the first event of the Stardom Super Wars which took place on November 3, 2021, she unsuccessfully challenged Ruaka for the Future of Stardom Championship. At Tokyo Super Wars from November 27, she teamed up with Unagi Sayaka in a losing effort against MOMOAZ (AZM and Momo Watanabe). At Osaka Super Wars, the last event of the trilogy from December 18, Nagatani competed in a 3-on-1 handicap gauntlet match where she teamed up with Mai Sakurai and Waka Tsukiyama in a losing effort against Syuri. At Stardom Dream Queendom on December 29, 2021, she fought in a five-way match won by Fukigen death and also involving Waka Tsukiyama, Saki Kashima and Rina.

At Stardom Award in Shinjuku on January 3, 2022, AZM, Saya Kamitani and Utami Hayashishita engaged in a brawl with Oedo Tai after their match against Fukigen Death, Saki Kashima and Ruaka. Obviously outnumbered, the three members of Queen's Quest reveiced help from Lady C who rushed down the ring to try to save them. After Oedo Tai retreated, Hayashishita offered C a spot into the unit which the latter accepted so she was later announced to join the stable in the process. At Stardom Nagoya Supreme Fight on January 29, 2022, Nagatani unsuccessfully shallenged Hanan for the Future of Stardom Championship. At Stardom Cinderella Journey on February 23, 2022, she teamed up with stablemate Utami Hayashishita in a losing effort against Oedo Tai's Momo Watanabe and Ruaka. At Stardom New Blood 1 on March 11, 2022, she teamed up with stablemate Saya Kamitani and went into a time-limit draw against Donna Del Mondo's Mirai and Maika. On the first night of the Stardom World Climax 2022 from March 26, Nagatani participated in a gauntlet match where she teamed up with her stablemates AZM and Miyu Amasaki. On the second night from March 27, she participated in a 18-women Cinderella Rumble match won by Mei Suruga and also involving certain wrestlers from out of Stardom such as Tomoka Inaba, Aoi, Haruka Umesaki, Nanami, Maria, Ai Houzan, and Yuna Mizumori. At the 2022 edition of the Stardom Cinderella Tournament, Nagatani fell short to Mai Sakurai in the first rounds from April 3. At Stardom Golden Week Fight Tour on May 5, 2022, she teamed up with Utami Hayashishita and AZM in a losing effort against Tam Nakano, Mina Shirakawa and Unagi Sayaka as a result of a six-woman tag team match. At Stardom New Blood 2 on May 13, 2022, Nagatani fell short to Yuna Mizumori in a singles match. At Stardom Flashing Champions on May 28, she teamed up with Saya Iida and Momo Kohgo to defeat Ami Sourei, Rina and Hina.

New Japan Pro Wrestling (2021) 
Nagatani was part of the series of exhibition matches to promote female talent hosted by New Japan Pro Wrestling. On the first night of the Wrestle Grand Slam in MetLife Dome from September 4 where she teamed up with Maika in a losing effort to Queen's Quest (Momo Watanabe and Saya Kamitani).

Personal life 
Before stepping up in professional wrestling, Nagatani worked as a middle and high school economics teacher. One of her initial dreams was to become a fashion designer so she attended the Bunka Fashion College and obtained a degree in vestimentar design.

References 

1994 births
Living people
Japanese female professional wrestlers
Sportspeople from Chiba Prefecture